The Free Speech League was a progressive organization in the United States that fought to support freedom of speech in the early years of the twentieth century. The League focused on combating government censorship, particularly relating to political speech and sexual material.

History
The League's main advocates included Edward Bliss Foote, his son Edward Bond Foote, Emma Goldman, and Theodore Schroeder. Other free speech advocates of that era included Ezra Heywood, Ben Reitman, Moses Harman, and D. M. Bennett. The league was formed in 1902. Two other members involved in the league's creation were Bob Robins and Lucy Robins Lang. In 1908 its goals were reported as "freedom of peaceable assembly, of discussion and of propaganda; an uncensored press, telegraph and telephone; an uninspected express; an inviolable mail." To achieve these goals, the League worked through the press, public speaking and the courts, feeling that "the education of brains and quickening of consciences are first in order of time and effect." The League's Secretary at the time was A. C. Pleydell of 175 Broadway in New York. The League was officially incorporated on April 7, 1911, in Albany, New York. The league's charter included the goal: "by all lawful means to oppose every form of government censorship over any method for the expression, communication or transmission of ideas... and to promote such legislative enactments and constitutional amendments, state and national, as will secure these ends."

One of the primary targets of the League was the Comstock Laws. After the Civil War, a social purity movement grew in strength, aimed at outlawing vice in general, and prostitution and obscenity in particular. Composed primarily of Protestant moral reformers and middle-class women, the Victorian-era campaign also attacked contraception, which was viewed as an immoral practice which promoted prostitution and venereal disease. A leader of the purity movement was Anthony Comstock, a postal inspector who successfully lobbied for the passage of the 1873 Comstock Act, a federal law prohibiting mailing of any material deemed to be obscene or related to sex in any way. Many states also passed similar state laws (collectively known as the Comstock laws), sometimes extending the federal law by outlawing the use of contraceptives, as well as their distribution. Comstock was proud of the fact that he was personally responsible for thousands of arrests and the destruction of hundreds of tons of books and pamphlets.

When an English anarchist named John Turner was arrested under the Anarchist Exclusion Act and threatened with deportation, Emma Goldman joined forces with the Free Speech League to champion his cause. The league enlisted the aid of Clarence Darrow and Edgar Lee Masters, who took Turner's case to the US Supreme Court. Although Turner and the League lost, Goldman considered it a victory of propaganda. She had returned to anarchist activism, but it was taking its toll on her. "I never felt so weighed down," she wrote to Berkman. "I fear I am forever doomed to remain public property and to have my life worn out through the care for the lives of others."

Margaret Sanger supported the cause of free speech throughout her career, with a zeal comparable to her support for birth control. Sanger grew up in a home where iconoclastic orator Robert Ingersoll was admired. During the early years of her activism, Sanger viewed birth control primarily as a free-speech issue, rather than a feminist issue, and when she started publishing The Woman Rebel in 1914, she did so with the express goal of provoking a legal challenge to the Comstock laws banning dissemination of information about contraception. In New York, Emma Goldman introduced Sanger to members of the Free Speech League, such as Edward Bliss Foote and Theodore Schroeder, and subsequently the League provided funding and advice to help Sanger with legal battles.

Around 1917 to 1919, the League gradually disbanded.

Works by Free Speech League members

 Flower, Benjamin Orange; Schroeder, Theodore; Post, Louse, In Defense of Free Speech: Five Essays from the Arena, 1908
Free Speech and the New Alien Law, Press Bulletins No. 1 and No 2. December 1903.
Schroeder, Theodore, Freedom of the Press and 'Obscene' Literature: Three Essays. 1906
Schroeder, Theodore, Constructive Obscenity, 1907
Schroeder, Theodore, Our Vanishing Liberty of the Press, 1907
Schroeder, Theodore, The Scientific Aspect of Due Process Law and Constructive Crimes, 1908.
Schroeder, Theodore, The Conflict Between Religious and Ethical Science, 1909.
Schroeder, Theodore, (Ed.), Free Press Anthology, Free Speech League, 1909.
Schroeder, Theodore, Constitutional free speech defined and defended in an unfinished argument in a case of blasphemy, Free Speech League, 1919
 Wakeman, Thaddeus, Administrative Process of the Postal Department: A Letter to the President, 1906.

See also
Birth control movement in the United States

Notes

References
Engelman, Peter C. (2011), A History of the Birth Control Movement in America, ABC-CLIO, .
Goldman, Emma, Candace Falk, Barry Pateman, Jessica M. Moran, Emma Goldman: Making speech free, 1902-1909, (Anthology), University of California Press, 2004
Graber, Mark A, Transforming Free Speech: The Ambiguous Legacy of Civil Libertarianism, University of California Press, 1992
Rabban, David M., Free speech in its forgotten years, Cambridge University Press, 1999
Wood, Janice Ruth, The struggle for free speech in the United States, 1872-1915: Edward Bliss Foote, Edward Bond Foote, and anti-Comstock operations, Psychology Press, 2008

Freedom of speech
Freedom of expression organizations
Organizations established in 1902
Legal advocacy organizations in the United States